Lists of ballet premieres by year
Lists of 1960s ballet premieres
Ball